Wilfrido "Willie" O. Marcial (born October 12, 1961) is a Filipino sports executive who serves as the tenth commissioner of the Philippine Basketball Association. He became the league's officer-in-charge after Chito Narvasa resigned on December 31, 2017. On January 25, 2018, he was appointed by the PBA Board of Governors as the 10th commissioner of the league.

PBA career
Marcial, a native of Batangas, started as a statistician in  during the time of former PBA Commissioner Leo Prieto. He also worked with the league's former TV partner, Vintage Television, as a floor director and also became a co-head statistician (alongside current head statistician Fidel Mangonon III) before being appointed as the league's Media Bureau Chief and Special Assistant to the Commissioner in 2003 during the time of former commissioner Noli Eala.

References

Living people
Philippine Basketball Association executives
People from Batangas
1961 births